James Bellamy may refer to:

 James Bellamy (Upstairs, Downstairs), a fictional character in the ITV period drama Upstairs, Downstairs
 James Bellamy (British academic) (1819–1909), British academic and administrator
 James A. Bellamy (1925–2015), American Professor Emeritus of Arabic Literature
 James William Bellamy (1788–1874), British headmaster of Merchant Taylors' School, Northwood 
 Jim Bellamy (1881–1969), English football player and manager